Cold Breath is a 2017 film by Abbas Raziji.
This movie was placed among 2017's ten best movies by the New Orleans Film Society.

Plot
Maryam is in her thirties. The one  who is born as a girl, passed puberty like a boy and in the way of subsistence tried hard every day just like a man...

Cast 
 Bita Badran as Maryam
 Nader Naderpoor as Ghasem
 Parichehr Riali as Nasrin
 Majid Mozaffari as Dr. Mansour
 Yasin Rasouli as Reza
 Kimia Mollaee as Raha
 Ezzatollah Ramezanifar as baba Rahim

Release and reception 
Cold Breath was screened at the competition section of the 41st annual Atlanta Film Festival. It was also screened at the London Independent Film Festival. It went on to win Best Narrative Feature at the Ridgefield Independent Film Festival, the Jury Award for Feature Narrative at the Mammoth Lakes Film Festival, and the Best Narrative Feature at the Calcutta International Cult Film Festival. Bita Badran was awarded Best Actress at the Salento International Film Festival. Abbas Raziji won the best director award from AOF film festival. This movie was placed among 2017's ten best movies by the New Orleans Film Society.

References

External links 
 

2017 films
Iranian drama films